Fernand Götz is a retired Swiss slalom canoeist who competed from the mid-1950s to the late 1960s. He won a bronze medal in the C-2 event at the 1965 ICF Canoe Slalom World Championships in Spittal.

References

Living people
Swiss male canoeists
Year of birth missing (living people)
Medalists at the ICF Canoe Slalom World Championships